Gut zu Vögeln is a German romantic comedy film directed by Mira Thiel and starring Anja Knauer and Max von Thun. Advertised as "an anti-romantic comedy", it was released in Germany on 14 January 2016.

The film's title is a sexual pun: in German, "Gut zu" means "good to", "Vögeln" means "birds", but the unisonous "vögeln" is a colloquialism for having coitus.

Plot 
Merlin is a young society reporter whose fiancé cancels their wedding shortly before the big day. Devastated, she lets her friends convince her to move into her brother's old room in a flat with two men, Jacob and Nuri. As she struggles to rebuild her life in the aftermath of the breakup, Jacob, a womanizing bartender with attachment issues, begins to coach her in the art of "short-term relationships". When the guys go on a trip to Mallorca, Merlin and her brother's pregnant girlfriend, Clara, decide to follow them and chaos ensues.

Cast 

 Anja Knauer as Merlin
 Max von Thun as Jacob
 Max Giermann as Simon
 Katharina Schlothauer as Clara
 Samy Challah as Nuri
 Ulrich Gebauer as Lillith
 Kai Wiesinger as Tillmann
 Christian Tramitz as Lord Bradbory
 Oliver Kalkofe as Dr. Adam
 Jochen Nickel as Gunnar
 Sonja Kirchberger as Sonja
 Joyce Ilg as Hannah
 Birte Glang as Nessi
 Anna Julia Kapfelsperger as Sue
 Hasan Ali Mete as Nuri's Dad
 Özay Fecht as Nuri's Mom
 Markus Knüfken as J.T.
 Susan Sideropoulos as Sandy
 Megan Gay as Jil Hagen

Jürgen Vogel has an uncredited cameo appearance in the film.

Production 
Gut zu Vögeln was produced by Viafilm in cooperation with Rat Pack Filmproduktion and Constantin Film Produktion.

The script was co-written by director Mira Thiel and her friend Judith Bonesky, based on their experiences as roommates in a student flat. The titular sexual pun was pinned on their refrigerator.

A first official trailer was released in mid-October 2015.

References

External links 
 

German romantic comedy films
2016 films
2010s German-language films
2016 romantic comedy films
2010s German films